Otto Laverrenz (born January 2, 1844, in Berlin, Prussia) was elected to the Wisconsin State Assembly in 1880. He was a Republican. From Milwaukee, Wisconsin, Laverrenz was a paper box manufacturer and a book binder.

References

People from Berlin
Politicians from Milwaukee
Businesspeople from Milwaukee
Prussian emigrants to the United States
1844 births
Year of death missing
Republican Party members of the Wisconsin State Assembly